Kentucky Route 12 (KY 12) is a State Highway located in Shelby and Franklin counties, in the northern region of the U.S. state of Kentucky. Parts of the route have existed since c. 1939, and the rest of the highway has existed since c. 1988.

Route description
KY 12 begins at a junction with KY 43 near Christianburg and travels east toward Bagdad passing through a rural area of mostly farmland. In Bagdad KY 12 forms a short concurrency with KY 395 before heading east out of Bagdad.  east of KY 395 the route forms a brief concurrency with KY 1005 and turns toward the northeast. After a few tenths of a mile KY 12 turns back toward the east and enters Franklin County where it becomes more narrow and curvy. 
 from the Shelby County line, KY 12 forms a junction with US 421. East of US 421 the route is known as Flat Creek Road and it winds toward the northeast and then to the north. KY 12 terminates at the Franklin-Henry County line just west of the Kentucky River. Nearly the entire route passes through rural sections of Shelby and Franklin Counties.

History
By at least 1939, the portion of highway traveling from State Route 43 to State Route 37 near the location of the present highway was designated as State Route 12. The portion of this road that traveled from KY 43 to the community of Bagdad had a graded, hard surface, the portion traveling from Bagdad to the Franklin County line was gravel surfaced, while the rest of the highway was unimproved. Between 1939 and 1941, the rest of present-day Route 12 was created as a graded, unpaved road, but was not yet designated as part of the highway. The next year, the entire length of the portion of the highway in Shelby County was improved. Also by 1955, the Franklin County portion had been named Dry Ridge Road. At least two years later, the length of the highway located from the western terminus to Bagdad had been paved. Between 1957 and 1962, the Franklin County portion of the route was improved to hard surface, and the route underwent minor rerouting. By 1967, the route had been paved, and had been rerouted to more of the modern route. By at least 1988, the rest of the present-day highway had been designated and paved.

Major junctions

References

External links

 
 

0012
0012
0012
0012